Bath Spa may refer to:

 Bath Spa railway station, Bath, Somerset
 Bath Spa University, one of two universities in Bath
 Roman Baths (Bath), a Roman spa complex constructed on hot springs, now a museum
 Thermae Bath Spa, a 2006 spa supplied by the hot springs

See also
 Bath, Somerset, a city in England